The 2022 season will be the 72nd season of competitive association football in China.

National teams

China national football team

Results and fixtures

2022 FIFA World Cup qualification

Third Round

EAFF E-1 Football Championship

China women's national football team

Results and fixtures

AFC Women's Asian Cup

Group A

Knockout stage

EAFF E-1 Football Championship

AFC competitions

AFC Champions League

Men's football

Super League

League One

League Two

Women's football

Super League

Football League

Managerial changes
This is a list of changes of managers within Chinese professional league football:

Chinese Super League

China League One

Notes

References

 
2022 sport-related lists
China